Aglossa oculalis is a species of snout moth in the genus Aglossa. It was described by George Hampson in 1906 and is known from the United States, including Texas.

References

Moths described in 1906
Pyralini
Moths of North America